The 15617  / 15618 Naharlagun–Guwahati Donyi Polo Express previously known as Naharlagun–Guwahati Intercity Express is a daily Intercity Express of the Indian Railways, which runs between Guwahati in Assam and Naharlagun in Arunachal Pradesh.

Stops

 Guwahati railway station 
 Kamakhya Junction railway station  
 Changsari railway station 
 Rangiya Junction railway station 
 Tangla railway station  
 Udalguri railway station  
 Dhekiajili Road railway station  
 Rangapara North Junction railway station 
 Biswanath Charali railway station  
 Gohpur railway station 
 Tatibahar railway station 
 Harmuti Junction railway station 
 Gumto railway station 
 Naharlagun railway station

Locomotive

The train is hauled by WDM-3A diesel locomotive of the Malda Shed.

Coach composition
The train consists of 15 LHB coach as follows:

 2 SLR
 8 Sleeper coach
 3 AC Three Tier
 1 AC Two Tier
 1 AC 1st Class cum Two Tier

References

Transport in Guwahati
Transport in Itanagar
Rail transport in Arunachal Pradesh
Rail transport in Assam
Intercity Express (Indian Railways) trains
Railway services introduced in 2015